Trafalgar is an administrative neighborhood of Madrid belonging to the district of Chamberí. As of 1 February 2021, it has a population of 24,748.

See also 
 Plaza de Olavide

References 

Wards of Madrid
Chamberí